The Women's Missionary Society of the Pacific Coast of the Methodist Episcopal Church was founded on October 29, 1870 by Methodist Rev. Otis T. Gibson, with eleven women he recruited in August 1870, for the purpose of working among the slave girls in Chinatown, San Francisco, California. By the end of 1870, Rev. Gibson had erected the building of the "Chinese Mission Institute". In October 1871, the first woman, Jin Ho, was rescued from the bay where she had attempted suicide. She began work in a Christian family and in two years married a Christian Chinese.  In 1873 a school was opened with Miss L. S. Templeton as teacher. The school mainly taught English and other necessary skills to Chinese and Japanese women and girls who had been rescued from slavery or prostitution in San Francisco Chinatown. 

The Oriental Home and School, as the home was sometimes called, was run by the Women's Missionary Society of the Pacific Coast, but it was misplaced in the Methodist Episcopal Church organization. In 1893, after formal recognition of its work by the Women's Home Missionary Society, it was incorporated into the larger Women's Home Missionary Society. Together they worked to rescue and educate slave girls. In all about 500 women and girls had been helped in one way or another, as of 1901. That same year, a handsome two-story concrete building with 22 rooms for the "Oriental Home for Women and Girls" at 912 Washington Street in San Francisco's Chinatown was dedicated by the Women's Home Missionary Society.  Unfortunately, this building, along with most of San Francisco Chinatown, was destroyed by the 1906 earthquake and fire.  

After the great quake and fire, Julia Morgan designed the replacement residence, a new three-story brick building with accommodations for 60 to 70 girls - orphaned, rescued or abandoned. It was built at 940 Washington Street in San Francisco Chinatown and was dedicated by the Women's Home Missionary Society in 1912.  Meanwhile, the Chinese Methodist Church was rebuilt in 1911 on the corner of Washington and Stockton Streets at 920 Washington Street.  Later in the 1940s, the three-story brick building at 940 Washington Street for the Oriental Home was renamed the Gum Moon Women's Residence.

References

http://www.gbgm-umc.org/awrc/english/abegin.html
"The Elimination of Prostitution?" Patricia O'Flinn

Chinese-American history
Christian missions in China
1870 establishments in California
History of women in California
History of San Francisco